Türkheim is a municipality in the district of Unterallgäu in Bavaria, Germany. The neighboring places of Türkheim are Ettringen, Berg, Rammingen, Irsingen, Wiedergeltingen and Amberg. The administrative collectivity of Türkheim administrate Türkheim and Irsingen.  The town is seat of a municipal association with Amberg, Rammingen and Wiedergeltingen.

Educational facilities in the municipality include Joseph-Bernhart-Gymnasium.

A subcamp of Dachau was once situated here.

References

Unterallgäu